Banksia Beach is a town and suburb on Bribie Island in the Moreton Bay Region, Queensland, Australia. In the  the suburb of Banksia Beach had a population of 5,995 people.

Geography

Banksia Beach is on the eastern coast of Bribie Island, separated from mainland Queensland by the Pumicestone Channel.

The western part of the suburb is within the Bribie Island National Park. Apart from that the land use is almost entirely residential. The areas closest to the coast are developed as canal estates, while the northern part of the suburb is residential housing intermingled with the Pacific Harbour Golf & Country Club.

History
The name Banksia Beach was the name of the estate subdivision assigned by the land developer Jock McIlwain. It was named as a township by the Qld Place Names Board on 23 November 1972. The name refers to the plant genus Banksia, which grows in the area.

 Banksia Beach to the north of the creek mouth
 Sylvan Beach to the south of the creek mouth extending south to Quota Park in Bongaree

but the canal development has replaced Dux Creek with two canal developments with Skippers Canal effectively replacing Dux Creek and extending south with Voyagers Canal extending to the north.

As part of the Australian Bicentenery commemoration, a monument to the exploration of Matthew Flinders was erected beside the beach and officially unveiled on 16 July 1988. It was designed by Kirsti Simpson and sculpted from Helidon sandstone by Tom Farrell.

Banksia Beach State School opened on 28 January 1992.

In the  the suburb of Banksia Beach had a population of 5,995 people.

Education
Banksia Beach State School is a government primary (Early Childhood-6) school for boys and girls at Sunderland Road. In 2018, the school had an enrolment of 1046 students with 70 teachers (64 full-time equivalent) and 43 non-teaching staff (28 full-time equivalent). It includes a special education program.

There is no secondary school in Banksia Beach. The nearest government secondary school is Bribie Island State High School in Bongaree to the south.

Amenities

Bribie Harbour Shopping Village is a shopping centre at 25 Sunderland Drive.

Bribie Island Community Arts Centre is an art gallery and community art centre at 191 Sunderland Drive.

Pacific Harbour Golf & Country Club is an 18-hole golf course at 141-159 Avon Avenue.

Solander Lake Bowls Club is at 70 Sunderland Drive.

There are a number of parks in the suburb, including:
 Col Fisher Park
 Cosmos Park

 Dampier Park

 Oxley Park

Attractions
The Matthew Flinders Exploration monument is in Col Fisher Park at the northern end of Solander Esplanade.

References

External links 

 

 

Suburbs of Moreton Bay Region
Bribie Island